Alistair Taylor (born 12 September 2001) is a Scottish professional footballer who plays as a midfielder for Alloa Athletic.

Career

Taylor made his first team debut for Kilmarnock in February 2020, while his brother Greg was playing for their opponents Celtic. On 1 June 2020, he declined a new contract and was due to leave the club. However, on 11 June 2020 he signed a new one-year contract with Kilmarnock. Taylor was loaned to Stranraer in March 2021. He left Kilmarnock at the end of the 2020–21 season.

Personal life
His older brother Greg plays for Celtic.

References

External links
 

2001 births
Living people
Scottish footballers
Kilmarnock F.C. players
Scottish Professional Football League players
Association football midfielders
Stranraer F.C. players
Alloa Athletic F.C. players